Hinterhoeller Yachts was a Canadian boat builder based in St. Catharines, Ontario. The company specialized in the design and manufacture of fiberglass sailboats.

The company was originally founded by George Hinterhoeller as Hinterhoeller Limited in Niagara-on-the-Lake, when he started boatbuilding in 1956. It was absorbed into C&C Yachts when he helped found that company in 1969. He sold his C&C shares in 1975 and restarted his own company in 1977. The company was wound-up in 1995 and Hinterhoeller died in 1999.

History

The first design produced was the Y Flyer, which Hinterhoeller built in his spare time while building power boats at Shepherd Boats in Niagara-on-the-Lake. He finished 40 Y flyers starting in 1956. The next was Hinterhoeller's original design, the Shark 24. It was first built in 1959 of wood and later in fibreglass and attained racing success.

The company went on to build designs such as the Redwing 30, Invader 36, Douglas 31/32 and the Frigate 36 during the late 1960s.

The company was absorbed into C&C Yachts when that company was formed in 1967, with Hinterhoeller as a founding partner. By 1975 Hinterhoeller had grown tired of working in a large corporate environment, sold his shares and retired. Two years later, in 1977, he reformed his old company in a purpose-built  facility in St Catharines, Ontario, on Lake Ontario.

The reformed company engaged yacht designers Mark Ellis for cruising boats like the Niagara 35 and the Nonsuch line and Germán Frers for racing boats like the Niagara 31. The Nonsuch boats achieved notable commercial success, with 975 built. They are noted for their distinctive hull shapes, large interiors and unstayed catboat rigs.

Richard Hinterhoeller, who was George's son and a partner in the reformed Hinterhoeller Yachts explained the company's operating concept. "The business plan was to operate a shop with two production lines. The two models were to be a 30' club racer/cruiser and a 35' bluewater cruising boat. Both were to be sensible, timeless models. George had been impressed by the Aurora 40 from Mark Ellis and contracted him to design the Niagara 35. For the smaller boat, George sat on his C&C 30 and made a list of the 10 items which would take an already great boat and make it better. In his typical down-to-earth fashion, George added up the necessary lengths of berths, head, cockpit and galley, and ended up with a target length of 31 feet."

In 1986 much of the production was moved to the Halman Manufacturing Company in Beamsville, Ontario. In 1989 the company entered receivership and was bought by Strategic Associates Inc. in 1990. In 1993 that company consolidated its production with C&C Yachts. Then, in 1994, a fire destroyed much of the C&C facilities and Hinterhoeller moved into what was left. Hinterhoeller Yachts closed down in November 1995. The Hinterhoeller trademarks expired in 1998 and George Hinterhoeller died from the complications from a stroke in the spring of 1999.

Boats 

Summary of boats built by Hinterhoeller Yachts:

Y flyer 1956
Shark 24 1959
Cygnus 20 1965
Invader 36 1965
Douglas 31/32	 1967
Hinterhoeller 28 1967
HR-28 (Hinterhoeller) 1967
Niagara 30 1967
Redwing 30 1967
Frigate 36 1968
Hinterhoeller 25 1969
Hinterhoeller 30 1969
HR-25 (Hinterhoeller) 1969
Redwing 35 1969
Niagara 26 1975
Aurora 40 1976
Niagara 31 1977
Niagara 35 1978
Nonsuch 30 1978
Hinterhoeller F3 1981
Nonsuch 26 1982
GT-26 (Hinterhoeller) 1983
Nonsuch 36 1983
Niagara 35 Encore 1984
Niagara 42 1984
Nonsuch 22 1984
Nonsuch 33 1988
Nonsuch 324 1994

See also
List of sailboat designers and manufacturers

References

Hinterhoeller Yachts